Beilschmiedia pergamentacea is a species of flowering plant in the family Lauraceae, native to southern China, Hainan, Vietnam, and Thailand. A tree reaching , it is often found growing on dry sandy soil, on sandstone, or alongside streams, in hilly or mountainous areas.

References

pergamentacea
Flora of South-Central China
Flora of Southeast China
Flora of Hainan
Flora of Thailand
Flora of Vietnam
Plants described in 1942